Liu Dingshuo (simplified Chinese: 刘丁硕; born 27 May 1998) is a male Chinese table tennis player.

Career

2021 
In September, Liu upset Xu Xin in the quarter-finals to reach the semi-finals of the China National Games. Liu won silver after defeating Wang Chuqin in the semi-finals and then losing to Fan Zhendong in the finals.

References

Chinese male table tennis players
1998 births
Living people
Table tennis players from Shandong